Lee Boysel (December 31, 1938 – April 25, 2021) was an American electrical engineer and entrepreneur.  While at Fairchild Semiconductor, he developed four-phase logic and built the first integrated circuit with over 100 logic gates, and designed the Fairchild 3800 / 3804 8-bit ALUs. Boysel designed the Four-Phase Systems AL1. He founded Four-Phase Systems to commercialize the technology, and sold the company to Motorola in 1981. Boysel was a graduate of the University of Michigan.

Patent litigation with Texas Instruments 
Texas Instruments claimed to have patented the microprocessor, and Lee Boysel in response assembled a system in which a single 8-bit AL1 was used as part of a courtroom demonstration computer system, together with ROM, RAM and an input-output device.

References

 
 
 
 
 
 
 
 

American electronics engineers
University of Michigan College of Engineering alumni
1938 births

2021 deaths